Roses, Convolvulus, Poppies and Other Flowers in an Urn on a Stone Ledge (1688) is an oil on canvas painting by the Dutch painter Rachel Ruysch.
It is an example of Dutch Golden Age painting and is now in the collection of the National Museum of Women in the Arts.

Ruysch has been recorded as making pendant paintings, with one painting of flowers (called a "bloemstuk") and another of fruit ("fruitstuk"), often on a forest floor. A pendant to this painting is unknown. Various attempts have been made to "read" her paintings in terms of the plants and insects shown in them, but generally they were simply treasured for their beauty and "cleverness". In this painting there are several botanically correct plants, with various insects on them.

This painting was gifted in 1986 by Wilhelmina Holladay. Its provenance doesn't go further back than an advertisement by Alan Jacobs Gallery Ltd., London, in 1984. This is typical for flower still life paintings: once they leave a collection, descriptions of them are too varied to pinpoint them exactly, and Ruysch's production was unusually high for a woman painter, mostly because she remained productive throughout her (very long) life.

Other "Flowers in a vase on a ledge" paintings by Ruysch are:

References 

Flower in a terracotta vase on a stone parapet, ca. 1688 in the RKD
 Roses, Convolvulus, Poppies and Other Flowers in an Urn on a Stone Ledge, in the National Museum of Women in the Arts

1680s paintings
Paintings by Rachel Ruysch
Flower paintings